RPM (1964–2000) was the oldest music industry publication in Canada and was considered the country's "music bible". It published Canadian national record charts from June 22, 1964 until its final issue on November 13, 2000. British band the Beatles and American singer Madonna tied for having the most number-one singles in Canada during this period, each with 18. Nevertheless, after the end of RPM, Madonna continued to score an additional four number ones on Nielsen SoundScan's Canadian Singles Chart between 2000 and 2007, and two number ones on Billboards Canadian Hot 100 since 2007, thus making her the artist with the most number-one singles in the history of Canadian recorded music.

Bryan Adams was the Canadian artist with the most Canadian number-one singles during the RPM era, with 10 number-one singles. Nevertheless, after the end of RPM, Canadian singer Justin Bieber surpassed his accomplishment, scoring 13 chart-toppers on Billboards Canadian Hot 100.

Artists with 10 number ones or more

See also
List of artists who reached number one on the Canadian Hot 100
List of artists by number of UK Singles Chart number ones

References

External links
 RPM Magazine at the AV Trust
 RPM chart search at Library and Archives Canada

Lists of artists by record chart achievement
RPM (magazine) charts